Wintermind is the second novel of the Masters of Solitude trilogy, written by authors Marvin Kaye and Parke Godwin.  The novel depicts a conflict between rural followers of a diseased mutant form of Christianity.

1982 American novels
American science fiction novels
1982 science fiction novels
Doubleday (publisher) books
Works by Parke Godwin